Kristián Flak (born 24 November 1999) is a Slovak professional footballer.

Career

MFK Tatran Liptovský Mikuláš
Flak made his professional debut for Tatran Liptovský Mikuláš against Slovan Bratislava on 24 July 2021.

References

External links
 MFK Tatran Liptovský Mikuláš official club profile
 Fortuna Liga profile
 
 Futbalnet profile

1999 births
Living people
Slovak footballers
Slovak expatriate footballers
Slovakia youth international footballers
Sportspeople from Košice
Association football defenders
AC Sparta Prague players
MFK Tatran Liptovský Mikuláš players
Irodotos FC players
Bohemian Football League players
Slovak Super Liga players
Super League Greece 2 players
Expatriate footballers in the Czech Republic
Expatriate footballers in Greece
Slovak expatriate sportspeople in the Czech Republic
Slovak expatriate sportspeople in Greece